Hynhamia decora is a species of moth of the family Tortricidae. It is found in Ecuador.

The wingspan is 17 mm. The ground colour of the forewings is cream, tinged with pale ferruginous and dotted with pale rust. The markings are rust brown. The hindwings are cream with some pale brown dots and mixed with ochreous in the apical area.

Etymology
The species name refers to the beautiful appearance of the species with refractive scales on the forewings and is derived from Latin decora (meaning beautiful).

References

Moths described in 2007
Hynhamia